The following are operators of the Avro Lancaster:

Military operators

Argentina
Argentine Air Force
From May 1948 to August 1949 the Argentine Air Force received 15 Lancasters (registered B-031 to B-045) previously operated by RAF.

Australia
Royal Australian Air Force
No. 460 Squadron RAAF
No. 463 Squadron RAAF
No. 467 Squadron RAAF

Canada
Royal Canadian Air Force
No. 6 Group RCAF (Wartime to 1945)
405 Squadron
408 Squadron
419 Squadron
420 Squadron
424 Squadron
425 Squadron
426 Squadron
427 Squadron
428 Squadron
429 Squadron
431 Squadron
432 Squadron
433 Squadron
434 Squadron
10 Group/Maritime Air Command(Post 1947)
103 Rescue Unit
2 Maritime (M) Operational Training Unit
404 Maritime Reconnaissance/Patrol Squadron 
405 Maritime Reconnaissance/Patrol Squadron 
407 Maritime Reconnaissance/Patrol Squadron
CFB Rockcliffe(Postwar)
408 Aerial Photography/Arctic Reconnaissance Squadron  
413 Aerial Photography Squadron

Egypt
Royal Egyptian Air Force

France
Aeronavale – 54 transferred from the Royal Australian Air Force beginning in 1952
Escadrille 5S
Escadrille 9S
Escadrille 10S
Escadrille 55S
Escadrille 56S

Poland
Polish Air Forces on exile in Great Britain
No. 300 Polish Bomber Squadron "Ziemi Mazowieckiej"

Soviet Union
Soviet Naval Aviation
Soviets were able to repair two of six Avro Lancasters which made forced landings near Yagodnik airfield, near Arkhangelsk during attacks on the German battleship Tirpitz. Both  ex-617 Squadron Avro Lancasters were operated briefly as transports and long range reconnaissance aircraft before being retired due to lack of spare parts.

Sweden
Swedish Air Force
Försökscentralen (Swedish Test Establishment) at Malmen near Linköping received one Lancaster I (ex-RAF RA805) designated Tp 80 and the SwAF/n 80001. Aircraft was modified by Avro company for jet engine testbed duties and delivered from UK in May 1951. The only Swedish Lancaster crashed in 1956.

United Kingdom
Royal Air Force
No. 7 Squadron RAF
No. 9 Squadron RAF
No. 12 Squadron RAF
No. 15 Squadron RAF
No. 18 Squadron RAF
No. 20 Squadron RAF
No. 35 Squadron RAF
No. 37 Squadron RAF
No. 38 Squadron RAF
No. 40 Squadron RAF
No. 44 Squadron RAF
No. 49 Squadron RAF
No. 50 Squadron RAF
No. 57 Squadron RAF
No. 61 Squadron RAF
No. 70 Squadron RAF
No. 75 Squadron RAF
No. 82 Squadron RAF
No. 83 Squadron RAF
No. 90 Squadron RAF
No. 97 Squadron RAF
No. 100 Squadron RAF
No. 101 Squadron RAF
No. 103 Squadron RAF
No. 104 Squadron RAF
No. 106 Squadron RAF
No. 109 Squadron RAF
No. 115 Squadron RAF
No. 120 Squadron RAF
No. 138 Squadron RAF
No. 148 Squadron RAF
No. 149 Squadron RAF
No. 150 Squadron RAF
No. 153 Squadron RAF
No. 156 Squadron RAF
No. 160 Squadron RAF
No. 166 Squadron RAF
No. 170 Squadron RAF
No. 178 Squadron RAF
No. 179 Squadron RAF
No. 186 Squadron RAF
No. 189 Squadron RAF
No. 195 Squadron RAF
No. 203 Squadron RAF
No. 207 Squadron RAF
No. 210 Squadron RAF
No. 214 Squadron RAF
No. 218 Squadron RAF
No. 224 Squadron RAF
No. 227 Squadron RAF
No. 231 Squadron RAF
No. 279 Squadron RAF
No. 514 Squadron RAF
No. 541 Squadron RAF
No. 550 Squadron RAF
No. 576 Squadron RAF
No. 582 Squadron RAF
No. 617 Squadron RAF
No. 619 Squadron RAF
No. 621 Squadron RAF
No. 622 Squadron RAF
No. 625 Squadron RAF
No. 626 Squadron RAF
No. 630 Squadron RAF
No. 635 Squadron RAF
No. 683 Squadron RAF
No. 1651 Heavy Conversion Unit RAF
No. 1653 Heavy Conversion Unit RAF
No. 1654 Heavy Conversion Unit RAF
No. 1656 Heavy Conversion Unit RAF
No. 1657 Heavy Conversion Unit RAF
No. 1659 Heavy Conversion Unit RAF
No. 1660 Heavy Conversion Unit RAF
No. 1661 Heavy Conversion Unit RAF
No. 1662 Heavy Conversion Unit RAF
No. 1664 Heavy Conversion Unit RAF
No. 1665 Heavy Conversion Unit RAF
No. 1666 Heavy Conversion Unit RAF
No. 1667 Heavy Conversion Unit RAF
No. 1668 Heavy Conversion Unit RAF
No. 1678 Heavy Conversion Unit RAF
No. 1 Lancaster Finishing School RAF
No. 3 Lancaster Finishing School RAF
No. 5 Lancaster Finishing School RAF
No. 6 Lancaster Finishing School RAF
No. 6 Operational Training Unit RAF
No. 230 Operational Conversion Unit RAF
No. 236 Operational Conversion Unit RAF

Fleet Air Arm
780 Naval Air Squadron

Civil operators

Argentina
Flota Aérea Mercante Argentina

Canada
Spartan Air Services
Trans-Canada Air Lines
World Wide Airways

United Kingdom
British European Airways
British Overseas Airways Corporation (BOAC)
British South American Airways
Flight Refuelling Limited
Skyways Limited

See also

Avro Lancaster

Notes

References

 Chant, Christopher. Lancaster: The History of Britain's Most Famous World War II Bomber. Bath, UK: Parragon, 2003. .
 Cotter, Jarrod. Living Lancasters: Keeping the Legend Alive. Thrupp, Stroud, UK: Sutton Publishing, 2005. .
 Franks, Richard A. The Avro Lancaster, Manchester and Lincoln: A Comprehensive Guide for the Modeller. London: SAM Publications, 2000. .
 Halley, James J. The Squadrons of the Royal Air Force. Tonbridge, Kent, UK:Air Britain (Historians), 1980. .
 Holmes, Harry. Avro Lancaster (Combat Legend series). Shrewsbury, UK: Airlife Publishing Ltd., 2002. .
 Jackson, A.J. Avro Aircraft since 1908, 2nd edition. London: Putnam Aeronautical Books, 1990. .
 Jacobs, Peter. The Lancaster Story. London: Arms & Armour Press, 1996. .
 Lyzun, Jum. "From Warhorse to Workhorse: Lancaster Mk.10 Variants in Canada". Air Enthusiast. No. 86, March/April 2000, pp. 16–26.
 Kotelnikov, Vladimir. "From Roundels to Red Stars". Aeroplane, January 2007, Vol 35 No. 1. pp. 24–27.
 Kulikov, Viktor P. British Aircraft in Russia. Air Power History, Vol. 51, 2004.
 Lake, Jon. Lancaster Squadrons 1942–43. Botley, UK: Osprey Publishing, 2002. .
 Lake, Jon. Lancaster Squadrons 1944–45. Botley, UK: Osprey Publishing, 2002. .
 Mackay, R.S.G. Lancaster in action. Carrollton, Texas: Squadron/Signal Publications Inc., 1982. .
 Marino, Atilio; Celleto, Vladimiro and Javier Mosquera. "Argentina's 'Heavies': Avro Lancaster, Lincoln and Lancastrian in Military Service: Part One". Air Enthusiast, No. 95, September/October 2001. pp. 64–70. 
 Mason, Francis K. The British Bomber since 1914. London:Putnam, 1994. .
 Moyes, Philip J.R. Avro Lancaster I & II. Kidlington, Oxford, UK: Vintage Aviation Publications Ltd., 1979. .
 Page, Bette. Mynarski's Lanc: The Story of Two Famous Canadian Lancaster Bombers KB726 & FM213.  Erin, Ontario: Boston Mills Press, 1989. .
 Postlethwaite, Mark. Lancaster Squadrons in Focus. Walton on Thames. Surrey, UK: Red Kite, 2001. .
 Robertson, Bruce. Lancaster – The Story of a Famous Bomber. Watford, Hertfordshire, UK: Argus Books Ltd., 1964 (5th impression 1977). .
 Sweetman, Bill. Avro Lancaster. London: Jane's Publishing Company Ltd., 1982. .

Lists of military units and formations by aircraft
Lancaster